The mountain pygmy owl (Glaucidium gnoma) is a small species of owl from the family Strigidae. They reside throughout southern Arizona, New Mexico and Mexico.

There is current taxonomic debate regarding its classification as an independent species or subspecies from that of the northern pygmy owl. Similar plumage colour and different vocal patterns are the primary characteristics fuelling this confusion.

The mountain pygmy owl hunts for small mammals and insects during the day from its high perches in pine-forested mountains, at elevations of 1,500 to 3,500 m. Breeding occurs once the female has chosen the appropriate cavity to form her nest. The female mountain pygmy owl will lay eggs between May and June. Owlets will leave their nests 23-30 days, after hatching. Although the International Union for Conservation of Nature (IUCN), has ranked this species as least concern, the increase in deforestation could impact the future population.

Taxonomy 
The taxonomy of the pygmy owl genus, (Glaucidium), remains disputed amongst taxonomic authorities. The International Ornithologists' Union, considers the mountain pygmy owl (Glaucidium gnoma) to be a separate species from the Northern pygmy owl (Glaucidium californicum). Whereas, the American Ornithological Society has amalgamated the mountain, Guatemalan (Glaucidium cobanense), Baja (Glaucidium hoskinsi) and northern pygmy owl, as the same species (conspecific) and classifies them all under Glaucidium gnoma and further categorizes them into respective subspecies. This northern pygmy owl complex ranges from North America to Central America. However, individuals inhabiting these regions demonstrate unique vocal patterns, indicating distinct species and population distribution. Although more research is required, genetic sequencing based on cytochrome b and nuclear markers suggests that Glaucidium gnoma and Glaucidium californicum are not conspecific.

Description 
The adult mountain pygmy owl is approximately 15–17 cm (5.9–6.7 in) in length. Males weigh from 48 to 54 g (1.7–1.9 oz); however, reverse sexual dimorphism indicates that adult females are larger in mass reaching 60 to 73 g  (2.1–2.6 oz). The wing length of a male is 86–89 mm (3.4–3.5 in) and that of a female is 87–98 mm (3.4–3.8 in), while the tail of both sexes can reach 61–66 mm (2.1–2.6 in).

Adult plumage colour is similar to that of most pygmy owls. The chest and throat are white, while the face is a deeper brown. The colour of the facial disk is a pale brownish-red (rufous), containing flecks of cream. In addition, their eyebrows are thin in shape and white in colour. The head, neck, wings and tail have a pale rufous base colour, with a cream spotted pattern. The exterior of the tail has 5 to 6 alternating bands of white and rufous. Visible on the underside of the tail are 3 to 4 alternating bars. The chest and underside are white with vertical, broken streaks of red-brown. The iris colour is yellow, similar to the colour of the feet and bill.

The plumage of nestlings (chicks) consists of whitish natal down feathers.  Within a few weeks, their second layer of down feathers starts to appear. The fledgling (juvenile) plumage resembles that of the adult pygmy owl. However, the crown (top of head) is grey, with minimal spotting on the forehead. Moreover, the eyebrows are white, thicker and more prominent than that of the adult.

Visual identification 
The individuals within the northern pygmy owl complex, although similar, each have their own characteristics used for identification. The mountain pygmy owl is small, with a short tail and slightly pointed wing-tips, in comparison to the northern pygmy owl, which is larger in stature with rounded wing-tips and a longer tail. The Guatemalan pygmy owl is distinguished by its vibrant red-brown plumage and white centre tail bars surrounded by a dark trim. The Baja pygmy owl is also small in size, similar to the mountain pygmy owl: however, it has rounded wing-tips like that of the northern pygmy owl. In addition, its throat is white in colour.

Habitat and Distribution 
The mountain pygmy owl resides in tropical and subtropical forests of oak, pine and evergreens; located in mountainous terrain at elevations from 1,500 to 3,500 m. Although, forests primarily composed of Ponderosa pines are preferential, as the reduced forest understory facilitates their hunting behaviours.

The species is distributed from southern Arizona and New Mexico to Oaxaca in southern Mexico.

Behaviour 
Individuals within the northern pygmy owl complex demonstrate similar behaviours; they are known to be aggressive, and relatively unsocial when compared to other owl species. They prefer to live alone, when not engaging in breeding pairs.

Vocalization 
There is limited information regarding specific seasonal calls or songs, pertaining to the mountain pygmy owl. However, it is suggested that vocal behaviour observed in the Eurasian pygmy owl, (Glaucidium passerinum), can be applied to the other pygmy owl species. Pygmy owls from British Columbia to California have a slow single hoot, compared to pygmy owls in southern British Columbia which have a slow double hoot. Individuals in the interior United States to Arizona have a fast single hoot, and a fast double hoot can be heard from southern Arizona to southern Mexico. Calls consist of two categories, primary and secondary. Territorial calls are considered primary and consist of an echoed single and or double "hooting/tooting", which can be heard close to sunrise and after sunset throughout the year. These calls can be heard more frequently in spring and fall. In addition, during nesting season, the male will call ahead with a soft hoot, when approaching the nesting cavity with food. The female has a similar but broken call, which she uses in communication with the male and when in danger. A form of duetting can be heard, where the male will hoot first and the female will answer in a lower tone. The secondary call is a song of increasing pitch that consists of 11 hoots. This call can be heard by both males and females, throughout the year. Furthermore, it is more frequent during autumn, when they are protecting their territory and encouraging their young to leave the nest.

Diet and Hunting 
The diet of the mountain pygmy owl consists of the following: insects, orthopterans (crickets, grasshoppers), beetles, small mammals (rodents) and reptiles. Their diet consists of a large portion of songbirds including the American robins and larger species.

Pygmy owls have a rather unique feeding habit, as they can consecutively consume prey head first. However, when consuming snakes, they do so tail first. They have a very high metabolism and require a constant food supply. The pygmy owl's lack of a crop and inefficient gastric digestion, inhibits its ability to digest bones, thus causing the formation and regurgitation of pellets.

The pygmy owl is a diurnal hunter but is also known to hunt around dawn and dusk. Interestingly, when in flight, the wings of the pygmy owl make noise, unlike other owl species which are silent fliers. While perching on a high branch it will search for prey, and once found, the pygmy owl will dive to the ground to catch it. It is significant to note that, if the attempt fails the owl will immediately search for new hunting grounds. The reason for this behaviour is that the pygmy owl is commonly mobbed by songbirds. This is a form of defence, where multiple songbirds will swarm a predator forcing them to leave the area.

Movement 
This species is mainly residential, as they do not migrate. The further northern pygmy owl species have a limited winter migration, descending from mountain regions to closer lowlands.

Reproduction 
Little has been observed regarding the social behaviour and reproduction of the mountain pygmy owl. Data is available from the Eurasian pygmy owl, which may be generalized and applied to the Northern pygmy complex. Sexual maturity can commence at 5 months of age, followed by breeding at the age of 1 year. Pygmy owls form monogamous pairs, usually spanning one breeding season. Though, a pairing could return to the same nesting location for up to four years.  The male displays courtship behaviour by a series of consistent hoots while jumping from branch to branch within a claimed territory. Initially, both sexes demonstrate hesitation and aggression towards each other. Duet singing decreases when the male demonstrates nesting behaviour. Nests are formed in either hollowed tree cavities or woodpecker holes. Once the male locates a possible nest, he will fly into it and inform the female via his call so that she may inspect it. The female will choose the ideal cavity and begin to clean it; copulation will occur soon after.

Mountain pygmy owls lay eggs between May 19 to June 14. Clutches range from 2 to 4 white eggs, which are laid at the base of the nest. The female will commence the approximately 28-day incubation period, once all the eggs have been laid. This would explain why chicks hatch within a short period of each other. It is thought that the mountain pygmy owl demonstrates similar feeding behaviour to that of the Eurasian pygmy owl. Once the eggs have hatched, the male mountain pygmy owl will provide more food to the female. An estimated 14 days after hatching, the nestlings have attained approximately 60% of their mature weight. It has been observed in several pygmy owl species that, within a month of hatching, 23-30 days, juveniles are able to fly and will leave their nests. The parental pair will remain in the vicinity of the nest, and provide protection for upwards of 20-30 additional days.

Grooming 
The practice of preening (grooming) is demonstrated across all owl species. They clean their feathers and remove foreign debris by carefully passing the feather through their partially open bill. Waterproofing of feathers is obtained by using their beak to spread the oil from their uropygial gland. This gland is located on the outer-side of the body, at the start of the tail. Facial feathers are maintained by the owl using its talons. Within breeding pairs, allopreening (i.e., both owls clean each other) has also been observed in members of the northern pygmy owl complex.

Conservation 
According to the International Union for Conservation of Nature (IUCN) the mountain pygmy owl is categorized as a least-concern species. However, the species is suspected to be declining in population due to habitat loss, from deforestation and fragmentation.

References

External Links 

 Mountain pygmy owl calls
 International Ornithologists' Union, Aves taxonomy list
 American Ornithological Society, Aves taxonomy list
 

Mountain pygmy owl
Mountain pygmy owl
Mountain pygmy owl
Owls of North America